Clément Nicolas Laurent Lenglet (born 17 June 1995) is a French professional footballer who plays as a centre-back for Premier League club Tottenham Hotspur on loan from La Liga club Barcelona and the France national team.

Lenglet began his career with Nancy, making 85 appearances from his debut in 2013, and winning the Ligue 2 title in the 2015–16 season. In January 2017, he joined Sevilla for a €5.4 million fee where he went on to make 73 appearances, scoring 4 goals, in an 18-month spell before joining Barcelona for €35 million.

Lenglet made his debut for the France national team in 2019, and represented the nation at UEFA Euro 2020.

Club career

Nancy
Born in Beauvais, Oise, Lenglet made his Ligue 2 debut with Nancy on 27 September 2013 in a goalless home draw against AC Arles-Avignon entering the field after 32 minutes for Rémi Walter.

He made 34 appearances over the 2015–16 season as Nancy won the second-division title. He scored his first goal for the team on 29 January 2016, equalising in a 3–1 home win over Clermont. He was sent off on 12 February for conceding a penalty with a foul on Serhou Guirassy in a 2–2 draw at Auxerre. On 25 April, he finished Benoît Pedretti's corner kick for the only goal of a win over Sochaux at the Stade Marcel Picot, winning his team promotion to Ligue 1 after a three-year absence.

In the first half of the 2016–17 season, he made 18 starting appearances in Ligue 1 for Nancy.

Sevilla

On 4 January 2017, Lenglet moved to Spain, signing a deal with La Liga side Sevilla until 2021. The transfer fee paid to Nancy was €5 million. He was brought in to replace compatriot Timothée Kolodziejczak, who had joined Borussia Mönchengladbach.

He made his debut for the Andalusians eight days later in a 3–3 home draw with Real Madrid in the last 16 of the 2016–17 Copa del Rey (6–3 aggregate loss). On 15 January he made his league debut against the same opponents in a 2–1 win at the Ramón Sánchez Pizjuán Stadium that ended their 40-match unbeaten run in all competitions. He played 17 of their league fixtures in the second half of the season.

On 19 August 2017, Lenglet scored his first goal for Sevilla, opening a 1–1 home draw against Espanyol in the first game of the new season; whether or not it crossed the line became a matter of controversy after the game. He scored his first goal in European competition on 1 November, heading Éver Banega's cross to open a 2–1 home win against Spartak Moscow in the UEFA Champions League group stage. Having been part of the Sevilla side that kept a clean sheet against Manchester United in the round of 16 first leg, ESPN put Lenglet into their Champions League Best XI.

Barcelona
On 12 July 2018, Lenglet joined Barcelona when they triggered his release clause of €35 million. He played the full 90 minutes for Barcelona as he helped them beat his former club Sevilla 2–1 in the 2018 Supercopa de España. On 23 September, Lenglet was sent off in his La Liga debut against Girona following an elbow on Pere Pons. He scored the winning goal in their Copa del Rey game against Cultural Leonesa in 1–0 win. He scored his first goal for Barcelona in La Liga against Real Sociedad at the Camp Nou. He provided an assist for compatriot Antoine Griezmann for Barcelona's first goal in a 3–0 win against Eibar away at the Ipurua on 19 October. Lenglet scored his first Champions League goal for the club on 8 August 2020, with a 10th minute header in a 3–1 victory at home against Napoli in Barcelona's round of 16 second leg match.

Loan to Tottenham Hotspur 
On 8 July 2022, Tottenham Hotspur announced that Lenglet had joined the club on a season long loan.  Lenglet scored his first goal for Tottenham at the final group stage match against Marseille in the Champions League to help the team win 2–1, which ensured that Tottenham finished top of the group to qualify for the knock-out stage.

International career
On 21 May 2019, Lenglet was called up to the French senior team by Didier Deschamps for a friendly match against Bolivia, and for two UEFA Euro 2020 qualifying games against Andorra and Turkey, all of them to be held in the first half of June 2019. He made his debut in the 4–0 away win over Andorra on 11 June, and scored his first goal in the 3–0 win in the reverse fixture on 10 September.

Lenglet was called up for the Euro 2020 finals. Deschamps brought him in for the last 16 match against Switzerland in order to play an untested 3–5–2 formation, due to injuries for left-backs Lucas Hernandez and Lucas Digne. France unexpectedly lost on penalties after a 3–3 draw, with Lenglet widely blamed for the first goal, in which Haris Seferovic beat him to a header. He was replaced at half time by Kingsley Coman.

Personal life
As a boy, Lenglet was a fan of Paris Saint-Germain. Occasionally, his father took him to the Camp des Loges to watch training sessions. Lenglet says he remembers seeing “Ronaldinho, Pauleta, and other big players who made history.”

Lenglet's younger brother, Corentin, is a full-back. He transferred from Nancy to Sevilla in the same deal, and spent one season in the C-team in Tercera División.

Career statistics

Club

International

France score listed first, score column indicates score after each Lenglet goal.

Honours
Nancy
Ligue 2: 2015–16

Barcelona
La Liga: 2018–19
Copa del Rey: 2020–21; runner-up: 2018–19
Supercopa de España: 2018

References

External links

 Profile at the FC Barcelona website
 Profile at the Tottenham Hotspur F.C. website
 
 
 
 
 

Living people
1995 births
Sportspeople from Beauvais
French footballers
Association football defenders
Ligue 1 players
Ligue 2 players
AS Nancy Lorraine players
La Liga players
Sevilla FC players
FC Barcelona players
Tottenham Hotspur F.C. players
Premier League players
French expatriate footballers
Expatriate footballers in Spain
French expatriate sportspeople in Spain
France youth international footballers
France under-21 international footballers
France international footballers
UEFA Euro 2020 players
Footballers from Hauts-de-France
Expatriate footballers in England
French expatriate sportspeople in England